John Bumstead (born 27 November 1958) is an English former footballer who played as a midfielder in the Football League for Chelsea, where he spent most of his career, and Charlton Athletic.

Club career
Bumstead started his career in the Chelsea youth set-up, and was well established in the first team by the time they won the Second Division in 1983–84, and with it promotion to the First Division. He helped them win the Full Members Cup in 1985–86, when they also finished sixth in the league. He remained with the club after their relegation in 1987–88 and collected a Second Division medal the following season as they regained their First Division status at the first attempt.

He remained with Chelsea for another two seasons, making a total of 409 appearances and scoring 44 goals, before being transferred to Charlton Athletic, where he spent two seasons before retiring from professional football in his 35th year.

Playing statistics

References

External links
 

1958 births
Living people
People from Rotherhithe
English footballers
Association football midfielders
Chelsea F.C. players
Charlton Athletic F.C. players
Bromley F.C. players